Probal Ghosh (born 21 June 1958) is an Indian former cricketer. He played seven first-class matches for Bengal between 1979 and 1985.

See also
 List of Bengal cricketers

References

External links
 

1958 births
Living people
Indian cricketers
Bengal cricketers
Cricketers from Kolkata